In mathematical logic, a literal is an atomic formula (also known as an atom or prime formula) or its negation. The definition mostly appears in proof theory (of classical logic), e.g. in conjunctive normal form and the method of resolution.

Literals can be divided into two types:
 A positive literal is just an atom (e.g.).
 A negative literal is the negation of an atom (e.g.).
The polarity of a literal is positive or negative depending on whether it is a positive or negative literal.

Double negation elimination occurs in classical logics but not in intuitionistic logic.

In the context of a formula in the conjunctive normal form, a literal is pure if the literal's complement does not appear in the formula.

In Boolean functions, each separate occurrence of a variable, either in inverse or uncomplemented form, is a literal. However, the expression  would also be said to contain four literals, because although two of the literals are identical ( appears twice) these qualify as two separate occurrences.

Examples 
In propositional calculus a literal is simply a propositional variable or its negation.

In predicate calculus a literal is an atomic formula or its negation, where an atomic formula is a predicate symbol applied to some terms,  with the terms recursively defined starting from constant symbols, variable symbols, and function symbols. For example,  is a negative literal with the constant symbol 2, the variable symbols x, y, the function symbols f, g, and the predicate symbol Q.

References

Mathematical logic
Propositional calculus
Logic symbols